Georg Streitberger (born 26 April 1981) is a retired World Cup alpine ski racer from Austria. Born in Zell am See, Salzburg, he specialized in the speed events and won three World Cup races, two in super G and one in downhill.

Streitberger competed for Austria at two Winter Olympics and two World Championships.

His 2016 season ended with a knee injury at the downhill at Kitzbühel, on a difficult dark and windy day on the Streif that also ended the season of overall leader Aksel Lund Svindal.

World Cup results

Season standings

Race podiums
 3 wins – (1 DH, 2 SG)
 10 podiums – (3 DH, 7 SG)

World Championship results

Olympic results

References

External links

Georg Streitberger World Cup standings at the International Ski Federation

Austrian Ski team (ÖSV) – official site – Georg Streitberger – 
Head Skis: Georg Streitberger
 

Austrian male alpine skiers
1981 births
Living people
Olympic alpine skiers of Austria
Alpine skiers at the 2010 Winter Olympics
Alpine skiers at the 2014 Winter Olympics
People from Zell am See
Sportspeople from Salzburg (state)